The Llandarcy Oil Refinery, also known as the National Oil Refinery, BP Llandarcy and Skewen refinery, was the United Kingdom's first oil refinery, initially opened by the Anglo-Persian Oil Company (renamed the Anglo-Iranian Oil Company from 1935 and the British Petroleum Company from 1954) on 29 June 1922, although operations had begun on 1 July 1921. Before this, the only oil refined in the UK came from Scottish shale.

History
The refinery cost £3 million and eventually covered an area of about 400 hectares.

Construction began in February 1919, and included construction of a new railway line. There were east and west facing connections on the Swansea District Line to the west of Jersey Marine Junction North. By the 1990s there were eight sidings and an unloading dock. The sidings were abolished by 2010.

The refinery was formally opened by Stanley Baldwin, the President of the Board of Trade. It was named after William Knox D'Arcy, the founder of Anglo-Persian.

Llandarcy was built as a model village to house refinery workers. In the 1950s about 2,600 people worked at the refinery.

When opened, it was producing around 150,000 gallons of petrol a day. By 1960, it was refining 8 million tons of crude oil a year and was the third biggest oil refinery in the UK after Fawley Refinery and Lindsey Oil Refinery.

In 1961, a new oil terminal was built by BP at Angle Bay in Pembrokeshire.

Llandarcy closed in 1998. The site was demolished in October 2009.

Operations 
As initially constructed the refinery produced petrol, kerosene and fuel oils. By 1924 it produced a complete range of petroleum products including a wide range of lubricants, oil for special purposes, and paraffin wax. In 1926 experimental thermal cracking units were installed.

The refining capacity of the refinery over its operational life is summarized in the table.

In 1970 BP built a new £16m lubricating oil complex. This raised the production of lubricating oil to 100,000 tonnes a year. It comprised a 30,000 barrel per day vacuum distillation unit, a 9,000 barrel per day propane de-asphalting unit, a 10,000 bpd extraction unit, a 6,240 bpd dewaxing unit, and a 6,000 bpd ferro-finer.

Half the capacity was decommissioned in late 1985, the remainder was closed in January 1986, together with the Angle Bay terminal and pipeline. The refinery was restructured as a specialist refinery until it was closed in 1999.

The refinery was the focus of a significant petrochemical industry in the area: the Baglan Bay complex.

Import pipeline 
Crude oil was originally imported through the purpose-built Queen’s Dock at Swansea, capable of handling tankers of up to 28,000 D.W.T. To accommodate larger tankers then being developed, a new jetty below Fort Popton and a new terminal was constructed at Angle Bay in Milford Haven, Pembrokeshire in 1962. The terminal could handle tankers of up to 100,000 D.W.T. (Dead Weight Tons). Crude oil was pumped from the jetties to five storage tanks built within the Fort and then to the tank farm at Kilpaison (51°40'29"N 5°02'47"W) on the south east edge of Angle Bay and then to Llandarcy through a new pipeline, from November 1960. The specification of the Angle Bay to Llandarcy refinery pipeline was as follows.

Location 
The site of the refinery, which covered 650 acres, was off the Llandarcy Interchange (Junction 43) of the present-day M4, near the B4290 and Skewen. The area is known as Coedffranc. To the south, off the A483, is Crymlyn Burrows.

See also
 BP Oil Refinery Ltd Ground
 National Oil Refineries/ BP Llandarcy - as football works team that played in the Welsh Football League and the Neath & District League

References

External links
 Coed Darcy
 History

1921 establishments in Wales
BP buildings and structures
Buildings and structures demolished in 2009
Buildings and structures in Neath Port Talbot
Demolished buildings and structures in Wales
Energy infrastructure completed in 1922
Energy infrastructure in Wales
History of Glamorgan
History of the petroleum industry in the United Kingdom
Industrial history of Wales
Oil refineries in the United Kingdom